Acantopsis is a genus of freshwater fishes, commonly known as horseface loaches or banana-root fishes, in the family Cobitidae. Fishes of the genus Acantopsis inhabit sandy riverbeds throughout Southeast Asia. The common horseface loach, A. rungthipae, is popular in the aquarium trade.

Species
There are currently seven recognized species in this genus:

 Acantopsis dialuzona van Hasselt, 1823 (Piglet horseface loach)
 Acantopsis spectabilis (Blyth, 1860) (Spectacular horseface loach)
 Acantopsis octoactinotos Siebert, 1991 (Dwarf horseface loach)
 Acantopsis thiemmedhi Sontirat, 1999 (Blackspotted horseface loach)
 Acantopsis rungthipae Boyd, Nithirojpakdee & Page, 2017, (Piebald horseface loach, common horseface loach)
 Acantopsis dinema Boyd & Page, 2017 (Peppered horseface loach)
 Acantopsis ioa Boyd & Page, 2017 (Slender horseface loach)

References

Cobitidae
Taxa named by Johan Conrad van Hasselt